CloudSight, Inc. is a Los Angeles, CAbased technology company that specializes in image captioning and understanding.

History

CloudSight was founded in 2012 by Dominik Mazur and Bradford Folkens. It was previously known as Image Searcher, Inc. and then CamFind, Inc., respectively. In 2016, the company was officially rebranded as CloudSight, Inc.

As of August 2022, CloudSight has 15+ granted patents for its technology. To date, CloudSight has recognized over 1 billion images. This dataset becomes invaluable for neural network training and the development of artificial intelligence.

Products

TapTapSee 

On October 11, 2012, CloudSight released its first mobile application into the AppStore, TapTapSee.

TapTapSee is a mobile camera application designed specifically for  blind and visually impaired iOS and Android users.

The application utilizes the device’s camera and VoiceOver functions to photograph objects and identify them out loud for the user.

TapTapSee was the 2014 recipient of the Access Award by the American Foundation for the Blind. In March 2013, TapTapSee was named App of the Month by the Royal National Institute for the Blind. At the end of 2013, TapTapSee was elected into the AppleVis iOS Hall of Fame.

CamFind 
On April 7, 2013, CloudSight released its second mobile application into the AppStore, CamFind. The mobile application surpassed 1,000,000 downloads within the first seven months after its release into the Apple AppStore.

CamFind is a visual search engine application that utilizes image recognition to photograph, identify, and provide information on any object, at any angle. Its image recognition capabilities are powered by CloudSight API.

CamFind is available in the Apple AppStore and Google Play Store where it received 11,000,000+ downloads as of 2022 combined between Apple Store and Google Play Store. In February 2015, CamFind was released on Google Glass via MyGlass.

In April 2015, CloudSight evolved CamFind a step further by releasing social network capabilities within the application. The app now features the ability for users to share the items they identify, as well as see the items that others are identifying with CamFind.

CloudSight API 

In September 2013, CloudSight released its CloudSight API to the general public.

"The CloudSight API employs deep learning, a technology that simulates the human brain, 'learning' from its mistakes over time, and is the same technology powering CamFind."

Google Cloud Marketplace 

On June 2, 2020, CloudSight announced the availability of their neural network products on Google Cloud Marketplace as part of a collaboration with Google Cloud.

References 

Mobile technology companies
American companies established in 2012
Technology companies based in Greater Los Angeles
Software companies of the United States
Applications of artificial intelligence
2012 establishments in California